Ria 89.7FM is a Malay radio station of Mediacorp in Singapore. This radio station operates on a 24-hour basis which plays the hottest Malay hits predominantly from the 90s to the present, and targets forward-thinking professionals, appealing to both genders. The station's DJs include veteran Azlin Ali, who has more than 20 years of experience in the radio industry.

The programmes on Ria 897 as of 2023 include Paparazzi Pagi with Adi Rahman and Azlin Ali on mornings,eNtITY with Nity Baizura on lunchtime,Ria MANIA with Danial on afternoons and Ria Kruz with Azura Goh and Fadli Kamsani on evenings,Malam Ini Kita Punya and Misteri Jam 12 with Saffwan Shah on overnight and midnight.

References

External links
RIA 897 Official Website
RIA 89.7FM

1990 establishments in Singapore
Radio stations established in 1990
Radio stations in Singapore
Malay-language radio stations